Meras River is a river of Sweden. It is a tributary of the Tärendö River.

Rivers of Norrbotten County